Aliivibrio is a genus in the phylum Pseudomonadota (Bacteria).

Etymology
The name Aliivibrio derives from:
Latin , other, another, different; New Latin Vibrio, a bacterial genus name, to give Aliivibrio, the other Vibrio.

Species
The genus contains:
 A. finisterrensis ( Beaz-Hidalgo et al. 2010, ; New Latin finisterrensis, pertaining to Finisterra, literally the end of the world (at least for the Romans who named the place). Galicia was the western end of the ancient Roman world.)
 A. fischeri ( (Beijerinck 1889) Urbanczyk et al. 2007,  (type species of the genus).; named after Bernhard Fischer, one of the earliest students of luminescent bacteria.)
 A. logei ( (Harwood et al. 1980) Urbanczyk et al. 2007, ; New Latin logei, of Loge; from German Loge, Norse god of fire and mischief.)
 A. salmonicida ( (Egidius et al. 1986) Urbanczyk et al. 2007, ; Latin noun salmo -onis, salmon; cida (from Latin caedo, to cut or kill), murderer, killer; salmonicida, salmon killer.)
 A. sifiae ( Yoshizawa et al. 2011, ; New Latin sifiae, of Sif, the name of Norse goddess (Sif's hair was made of gold, and the name was chosen to reflect the yellow color of the luminescence).)
 A. wodanis ( (Lunder et al. 2000) Urbanczyk et al. 2007, ; New Latin wodanis, of Wodan, the Norse god of art, culture, war and the dead, because its closest relative, Vibrio logei (Aliivibrio logei), also a cold-water vibrio.)

See also
 Bacterial taxonomy
 Microbiology

References

Bacteria genera
Vibrionales